James Jefferson Britt (March 4, 1861 – December 26, 1939) was an American educator and politician who served one term as a United States representative in Congress from North Carolina from 1915 to 1917.

Biography
James Jefferson Britt was born near Johnson City, Tennessee, in present-day Unicoi County on March 4, 1861. He attended the common schools and studied under private tutors.

Early career 
He was principal of Burnsville (N.C.) Academy from 1886 to 1893. He was then superintendent of the public schools of Mitchell County 1894-1896 and headmaster of Bowman Academy, Bakersville, N.C., 1895–1896.

Britt was deputy collector of internal revenue at Asheville, N.C., 1896–1899. He studied law at the University of North Carolina at Chapel Hill, he was admitted to the bar in 1900 and commenced practice in Asheville.

Political career 
He was a delegate to the Republican National Convention in 1904. He was an unsuccessful candidate for election in 1906 to the Sixtieth Congress but was a special assistant United States attorney in 1906 and 1907. Britt became a member of the North Carolina Senate from 1909 to 1911, he was part of the special counsel to the Post Office Department from July 1, 1909, to December 1, 1910. He was again special assistant to the Attorney General from July 13, 1910, to December 1, 1910.

Britt was appointed Third Assistant Postmaster General by President Taft on December 1, 1910, and served until March 17, 1913.

Congress 
He was elected as a Republican to the Sixty-fourth Congress (March 4, 1915 – March 3, 1917). He successfully contested the election of Zebulon Weaver to the Sixty-fifth Congress (March 4, 1917 – March 4, 1919), but was an unsuccessful candidate for re-election to the Sixty-sixth Congress in 1918.

Later career 
He resumed the practice of law in Asheville, N.C. and served as chief counsel for the Bureau of Prohibition, Treasury Department, 1922–1932. Britt was an unsuccessful candidate for the position of chief justice for the North Carolina Supreme Court in 1926. He once again resumed the practice of law in 1933.

Death 
James J. Britt died on December 26, 1939, in Asheville, N.C. and was interred in Riverside Cemetery.

References

External links
 

1861 births
1939 deaths
Republican Party North Carolina state senators
People from Unicoi County, Tennessee
Republican Party members of the United States House of Representatives from North Carolina
University of North Carolina at Chapel Hill alumni